Mika Pekka Kari (born 19 August 1967, in Lahti) is a Finnish politician currently serving in the Parliament of Finland for the Social Democratic Party of Finland at the Tavastia constituency.

References

1967 births
Living people
People from Lahti
Social Democratic Party of Finland politicians
Members of the Parliament of Finland (2011–15)
Members of the Parliament of Finland (2015–19)
Members of the Parliament of Finland (2019–23)